Mat Siscoe is a Canadian politician who is the current mayor of St. Catharines, Ontario. Previously Siscoe sat on St. Catharines City Council for twelve years, before being appointed to Niagara Regional Council to fill a vacancy left by the death of councillor Sandie Bellows.

He ran for the Progressive Conservative Party of Ontario in St. Catharines in the 2014 Ontario general election.

References 

Mayors of St. Catharines
Living people
Progressive Conservative Party of Ontario candidates in Ontario provincial elections
Year of birth missing (living people)